The 19th National Geographic Bee was held in Washington, D.C. on May 23, 2007, sponsored by the National Geographic Society.

Overview 
The final competition was moderated by Jeopardy! host Alex Trebek. The winner was Caitlin Snaring, a homeschooled student from Redmond, Washington, who won a $25,000 college scholarship and lifetime membership in the National Geographic Society. The 2nd-place winner, Suneil Iyer of Kansas, won a $15,000 scholarship. The 3rd-place winner, Mark Arildsen of Tennessee, won a $10,000 scholarship.

References

External links
 National Geographic Bee Official Website

National Geographic Bee